The Provisional District of Saskatchewan was a federal electoral district in Northwest Territories, Canada, that was represented in the House of Commons of Canada from 1887 to 1905.

This riding was created in 1886. It consisted of the Provisional District of Saskatchewan.

The electoral district of Saskatchewan was originally within the geographical region of the Northwest Territories. With the creation of the province of Saskatchewan in 1905, this riding, with territory in Alberta as well, was replaced in 1907 by Saskatchewan riding within the province of Saskatchewan.

Election results

|-

|-

By-election: Hon. W. Laurier appointed Prime Minister, July 11, 1896

See also 

 List of Canadian federal electoral districts
 Past Canadian electoral districts

External links 
Riding history for Saskatchewan (Provisional District), Northwest Territories (1886–1905) from the Library of Parliament

Former federal electoral districts of Northwest Territories